South River is an unincorporated community in Anne Arundel County, Maryland, United States.  South River Club was listed on the National Register of Historic Places in 1969.

See also
South River Federation

References

Unincorporated communities in Anne Arundel County, Maryland
Unincorporated communities in Maryland